Antonella Bortolozzi (born 22 January 1986) is an Argentine volleyball player who is a member of the Argentina national team.

Career 
She participated at the 2005 Women's Pan-American Volleyball Cup, 2006 Women's Pan-American Volleyball Cup, and 2011 FIVB Volleyball Women's World Cup.

References

External links 
 FIVB profile

1986 births
Living people
Argentine women's volleyball players
People from San Jerónimo Department
Sportspeople from Santa Fe Province